Laundry Day (stylized in all caps) is an American pop rock band from Manhattan, New York, formed in 2018. The group currently consists of vocalists Sawyer Nunes and Jude Ciulla, guitarist Henry Weingartner, drummer Etai Abramovich, and bassist Henry Pearl. The band was formed while all five current members were students at Beacon High School.

History
Vocalists Sawyer Nunes and Jude Ciulla, who had been friends prior to starting the band, began making music together while attending Beacon High School in the Hell's Kitchen area of Manhattan in New York City. Nunes had previously appeared on Broadway, in the original Broadway casts of Finding Neverland as George Llewelyn Davies and Gettin' the Band Back Together as Ricky. After the two created their first song together, their friends/classmates Henry Weingartner and Etai Abramovich joined the band. Henry Pearl, another friend from Beacon, joined the band afterwards.

Laundry Day released their debut album, Trumpet Boy, in March 2018, via their independent label Polo and Fomo. They embarked on their first national tour, the All My Friends Tour, in the same month, to further promote the album. Their second studio album, Homesick, was released in March 2019. The album was co-produced with Romil Hemnani of Brockhampton and recorded partially at Shangri-La Studio. The band performed at the Austin City Limits Music Festival in October 2019, and in November 2019, they performed at Tyler, the Creator's Camp Flog Gnaw Carnival. That same month, they played as an opening act for The 1975 during the North American leg of their A Brief Inquiry Into Online Relationships Tour, and played as an opening act for Clairo in December 2019 during the European leg of her Immunity Tour.  Their song "Friends" was used as the closing song in the season 3 finale of the Netflix series On My Block.

Public image
NME placed Laundry Day on the NME 100, their annual list of "essential new artists", in January 2020.

Artistry
Laundry Day have cited their biggest influences as rapper Tyler, the Creator and the band Brockhampton. Laundry Day's members are multi-instrumentalists, and often play different instruments on their songs than those which they play live. Their "DIY ethos" has been remarked upon by various publications. Their sound has been defined as "genre-defying".

Members
Current members
 Sawyer Nunes – vocals, guitar (2018–present)
 Jude Ciulla – vocals (2018–present)
 Henry Weingartner – guitar (2018–present)
 Etai Abramovich – drums (2018–present)
 Henry Pearl – bass (2018–present)

Discography

Albums

Studio albums

Extended plays

Singles

Music videos

Tours
Headlining
 All My Friends Tour (2019)
 Together Forever Tour (2019)
 We Switched Bodies Tour (2022)

Opening acts
 Clairo – Immunity Tour (2019)
 The 1975 – A Brief Inquiry Into Online Relationships Tour (2019)

References

2017 establishments in New York City
2017 in American music
2010s in Manhattan
American pop rock music groups
Musical groups established in 2017
Musical groups from New York City
Rock music groups from New York (state)